Phyllonorycter oregonensis is a moth of the family Gracillariidae. It is known from Oregon, United States.

The wingspan is about 7 mm.

The larvae feed on Symphoricarpos species, including Symphoricarpos albus. They mine the leaves of their host plant.

References

oregonensis
Moths of North America
Moths described in 1889